The National Liberal Party was a Danish political party or political movement  from 1842 until 1882.

Often considered "the first Danish political party" the National Liberals were gradually founded as the opposition against the Danish absolute monarchy. It was inspired by German movements and its base was merchants, industrials, officials and especially students and academics. Among its leading figures were Orla Lehmann, Ditlev Gothard Monrad, Andreas Frederik Krieger, Carl Ploug and Carl Christian Hall but many elder businessmen and officials were leaders until the 1840s.

Its political goal was a constitutional government and free liberal economy, mixed with a strong national attitude towards the Germans, especially on the Schleswig-Holstein Question. It gradually grew stronger during the 1840s, and at the crisis and fall of absolutism 1848 it was the driving force. After a short participation in cabinet it went into opposition until 1854. From then and until 1864 it was the leading Danish party especially led by Hall. Its press became an indisputable political factor. Besides it carried through some economic liberal reforms.

Its inability to handle the difficult Schleswig question led to defeat in the Second Schleswig War (1864), which ended its power, and also damaged the prestige of the party. During the next years it went into the background. In 1866-75 it was the coalition partner of Højre, and soon most National Liberal veterans joined the conservative side. From about 1880 the party was quietly dissolved, split between the new combatants of the Constitutional Struggle of Denmark.

Election results

Parliament (Folketing)

References

Denmark POLITICAL PARTIES at nationsencyclopedia.com

Denmark 1830
Defunct political parties in Denmark
Liberal parties in Denmark
National liberal parties
Political parties established in 1842
Political parties disestablished in 1882
1842 establishments in Denmark
1882 disestablishments in Denmark